The Aamjiwnaang First Nation (formerly known as Chippewas of Sarnia First Nation) is an Anishinaabe (Ojibwe)  First Nations Band located on reserve land by the St. Clair River, three miles south of the southern tip of Lake Huron. The reserve is located across from the United States border from Port Huron, Michigan, and is a result of treaties that were negotiated with the Crown in the 1820s. There are approximately 2,000 band members with about 850 living on the reserve. Their heritage language is Ojibwe.

The word Aamjiwnaang (am-JIN-nun) means "meeting place by the rapid water", which describes the surrounding communities.

Environmental issues

The Aamjiwnaang community has expressed concern regarding its proximity to  petrochemical, polymer, and chemical plants in the area, as birth rates of their people have been documented by the American journal Environmental Health Perspectives as deviating from the normal ratio of close to 50% boys, 50% girls. The ratio as found between 1999 and 2003 by the journal was roughly 33% boys, and 67% girls. The First Nation is concerned that this abnormal trend is due to adverse effects of maternal and fetal exposure to the effluent and emissions of the nearby chemical plants. This is the first community in the world to have a birth rate of two girls to every boy.

Demographics

Notable members
 Lisa Jackson (filmmaker)
 Christopher Plain - Current Chief 
 June Simon - Band Manager 
 Carolyn Nahmabin - Membership 
 Fred Plain - Former President of the Union of Ontario Indians
 David D. Plain - Author of The Plains of Aamjiwnaang:Our History

See also
 Chippewas of Sarnia Band v. Canada (Attorney General)
 Environmental impact of the chemical industry in Sarnia
 Cancer Alley
 Uranium mining and the Navajo people

References

External links
 Aamjiwnaang First Nation - Home
 2001 Community Profiles for Sarnia 45 from Statistics Canada
 Aboriginal Affairs and Northern Development Canada profile

First Nations governments in Ontario
Municipalities in Lambton County